Peter Jaffé OAM (19 April 1914 - 14 August 2005) was an Australian philatelist who was added to the Roll of Distinguished Philatelists in 1992.

Jaffé was educated at Rugby School and King's College, Cambridge.

References

Signatories to the Roll of Distinguished Philatelists
Australian philatelists
1914 births
2005 deaths
Fellows of the Royal Philatelic Society London
Alumni of King's College, Cambridge
Recipients of the Medal of the Order of Australia
British emigrants to Australia